The 1944 United States presidential election in Oregon took place on November 7, 1944, as part of the 1944 United States presidential election. Voters chose six representatives, or electors, to the Electoral College, who voted for president and vice president.

Oregon was won by then president Franklin D. Roosevelt over Governor of New York Thomas Dewey by a slim margin of 4.85%.

Results

Results by county

See also
 United States presidential elections in Oregon

References

Oregon
1944
1944 Oregon elections